The 1889 Cork Senior Hurling Championship was the third staging of the Cork Senior Hurling Championship since its establishment by the Cork County Board in 1887. 

Tower St. were the defending champions.

Blackrock won the championship after receiving a walkover from Aghada in the final. This was their second championship title overall and their first in two championship seasons.

Results

Final

References

Cork Senior Hurling Championship
Cork Senior Hurling Championship